USS Julia may refer to the following ships of the United States Navy:

 , was a schooner during the War of 1812
 , was an English sloop captured by the Union Navy 8 January 1863 and sold in 1865

United States Navy ship names